Guildford College of Further and Higher Education (GCFHE) in Guildford, Surrey was a Surrey County Council-funded educational establishment for students of age 16+ undertaking full-time and part-time studies, established in 1939. It became part of oxford-based group Activate Learning in March 2019, and left Surrey County Council control.

Its original campus is signposted and known as Guildford College.

Campuses
Stoke Road on the former north-west corner of Stoke Park, Guildford
Merrist Wood near Worplesdon which traditionally specialises in practical and theoretical landscape-related careers and agricultural vocational courses
Since 2007: Farnham College in the town of Farnham which sits on the Hampshire border.

Merrist Wood College

For its education purposes the college manages 400 acres (1.6 km²) of land from which expertise it produces valuable produce and, adjoining hedgerows, supports biodiversity. Key specialisations are:
horticulture
floristry
BTS studies
landscaping
garden design
animal care
countryside
golf course and landscapes maintenance and enhancement
sports turf maintenance and enhancement
arboriculture
equine studies.

See also
List of forestry universities and colleges
List of further education colleges in England

Notable alumni
Julie Dawn Cole, Actor
Paul Merrett, ITV Chef
Sam Underwood, Actor

References

External links

Merrist Wood website

Further education colleges in Surrey
Educational institutions established in 1939
1939 establishments in England
Education in Guildford
Agricultural universities and colleges in the United Kingdom